The following lists events that happened during 1926 in South Africa.

Incumbents
 Monarch: King George V.
 Governor-General and High Commissioner for Southern Africa: The Earl of Athlone.
 Prime Minister: James Barry Munnik Hertzog.
 Chief Justice: James Rose Innes.

Events

March
 13 – The first commercial air route from South Africa is established when Alan Cobham does a return flight between London and Cape Town.

October
 10 – The South African National War Memorial next to Delville Wood outside Longueval, France is opened.
 10 – The Sabie Game Reserve is renamed to Kruger National Park.

Births
 23 May – Joe Slovo, politician, in Obeliai, Lithuania. (d.1995)
 11 September; Gerrit Viljoen, government minister. (d. 2009)
 15 October – Rexon Mathebula, artist, in Sophiatown, Johannesburg.
 24 December – Ronald Draper, cricketer

Deaths

Railways

Railway lines opened
 18 January – Transvaal – Villiers, Free State to Grootvlei, .
 7 June – Free State – Harrismith to Warden, .
 18 August – Cape – Upington to Kakamas (Narrow gauge), .
 1 September – Cape – Addo to Sunland, .
 15 September – Natal – Mtubatuba to Candover, .
 19 November – Cape – Katberg to Seymour (Narrow gauge), .
 22 November – Transvaal – Citrus to Plaston, .
 8 December – Cape – Klawer to Landplaas, .

Locomotives
Three Cape gauge locomotive types enter service on the South African Railways (SAR):
 The first twenty-three Class 15CA 4-8-2 Mountain type locomotives.
 Four Class FD 2-6-2+2-6-2 Modified Fairlie articulated steam locomotives.
 To address a shortage of suitable shunting locomotives, the first of twenty-one ex Natal Government Railways Class D1  tank locomotives are rebuilt to Class 17 4-8-0 tank-and-tender locomotives.

References

 
South Africa
Years of the 20th century in South Africa